Knut Jacobsen may refer to:
 Knut Jacobsen (politician) (1885–1976), Norwegian banker and politician
 Knut A. Jacobsen, Norwegian scholar of the history of religions 
 Knut Jacobsen (actor) (1910–1971), Norwegian actor and costume designer